George Funston Miller (September 5, 1809 – October 21, 1885) was a Republican member of the U.S. House of Representatives from Pennsylvania.

George F. Miller was born in Chillisquaque Township, Pennsylvania.  He attended Kirkpatrick's Academy in Milton, Pennsylvania.  He taught school, studied law, was admitted to the bar of Union County, Pennsylvania, May 15, 1833, and commenced practice in Lewisburg, Pennsylvania.  He was a member of the board of curators of the University at Lewisburg (now Bucknell University) from 1846 to 1882.  He served as scribe of curators from 1847 to 1851, and secretary of the board of trustees of Bucknell University from 1848 to 1864.

Miller was elected as a Republican to the Thirty-ninth and Fortieth Congresses.  He resumed the practice of law, and served as president of the Lewisburg, Centre & Spruce Creek Railroad.  He died in Lewisburg in 1885.  Interment in Lewisburg Cemetery.

Sources

The Political Graveyard

Pennsylvania lawyers
1809 births
1885 deaths
Republican Party members of the United States House of Representatives from Pennsylvania
19th-century American politicians
19th-century American lawyers